Xàtiva is a metro station of the Metrovalencia network in Valencia, Spain. It is situated on Carrer de Xàtiva, in the southern part of the city centre. It is an interchange station with access to the main railway station. The station is an underground structure.

Metrovalencia stations